Project Jonah is an environmental organisation that was established in 1974 in New Zealand. It specialises in the protection and conservation of marine mammals (whales, dolphins and seals).

The key areas in which they work is rescuing stranded marine mammals, advocacy for marine mammals, ensuring compliance with legislation. They are regularly involved in rescuing stranded whales around New Zealand. New Zealand has one of the highest rates of whale strandings with the beached whales, and marine mammals in general, being the responsibility of the Department of Conservation.

Project Jonah gave a major impetus for the government to create the Marine Mammals Protection Act 1978.

See also
Anti-whaling
Marine conservation activism
Jonah, in the Bible

References

External links
Project Jonah

Nature conservation organisations based in New Zealand
Whale conservation
Organizations established in 1974
Wildlife rehabilitation and conservation centers
Animal welfare organisations based in New Zealand